This page is a list of articles related to set theory.

Articles on individual set theory topics

Lists related to set theory
 Glossary of set theory  
 List of large cardinal properties  
 List of properties of sets of reals  
 List of set identities and relations

Set theorists

Societies and organizations
 Association for Symbolic Logic  
 The Cabal  

 Topics
Set theory